Burn 'Em Up Barnes is a 1934 American Pre-Code movie serial produced and distributed by Mascot Pictures, along with a feature version of the serial bearing the same title. It was a loose remake of the 1921 silent film of the same name.

Cast
Jack Mulhall as Burn-'em-Up Barnes, racing driver nicknamed the "King of the Dirt Track" and shortly the co-owner of the Temple Barnes Transportation school bus company
Frankie Darro as Bobbie Riley, Barnes' kid sidekick and ward following his brother's accidental death
Lola Lane as Marjorie Temple, owner of the Temple (later Temple Barnes) Transportation school bus company and land with a hidden wealth of oil
Julian Rivero as Tony, Marjorie's bumbling Italian-accented mechanic
Edwin Maxwell as Lyman Warren
Jason Robards as John Drummond, crooked race promoter who knows that Marjorie's land is really worth millions and will stop at nothing to get it
Francis McDonald as Ray Ridpath, villainous driver working for Drummond

Chapter titles
 King of the Dirt Tracks
 The Newsreel Murder
 The Phantom Witness
 The Celluloid Clue
 The Decoy Driver
 The Crimson Alibi
 Roaring Rails
 The Death Crash
 The Man Higher Up
 The Missing Link
 Surrounded
 The Fatal Whisper
Source:

DVD release
Burn 'Em Up Barnes was released on Region 0 DVD by Alpha Video on November 27, 2007. A feature-length version of the serial was released on Region 0 DVD-R by Alpha Video on October 30, 2012, but this is not the same as the feature version originally prepared by Mascot Pictures; its origins are unknown. The 1921 silent version of the serial was released on Region 0 DVD-R by Alpha Video on July 7, 2015.

See also
 List of film serials by year
 List of film serials by studio
 List of films in the public domain in the United States

References

External links

Download or view online
 
 Archive Classic Movies (Flash format)
 Archive Classic Movies (MPEG4 Download)

1934 films
1930s English-language films
1930s adventure comedy films
American adventure comedy films
American auto racing films
American black-and-white films
Mascot Pictures film serials
Films directed by Armand Schaefer
Films produced by Nat Levine
1934 comedy films
1930s American films